Lethal(2) giant larvae protein homolog 1 is a protein that in humans is encoded by the LLGL1 gene.

This gene encodes a protein that is similar to a tumor suppressor in Drosophila. The protein is part of a cytoskeletal network and is associated with nonmuscle myosin II heavy chain and a kinase that specifically phosphorylates this protein at serine residues. The gene is located within the Smith-Magenis syndrome region on chromosome 17.

References

Further reading